The July 1865 Bruce by-election was a New Zealand by-election held in the electorate of  during the 3rd New Zealand Parliament on 27 July 1865 triggered by the resignation of Edward Cargill. Three candidates were nominated but one of them withdrew during the nomination meeting. James Macandrew was the successful candidate; he defeated John Cargill, a former Member of Parliament and a brother of the incumbent.

Background
A large meeting was held on Saturday, 8 July, to discuss who should contest the superintendency election, and who could represent the Bruce electorate in parliament. On the latter question, John Cargill and William John Dyer were discussed as candidates. There was concern about John Cargill's suitability as their representative, and the meeting finished with passing the following resolution unanimously:

That this meeting does not consider Mr. John Cargill a suitable person to represent Bruce, and request Mr. W. J. Dyer to offer himself as a candidate for the representation of the County.

Election results

Results by polling booth
The polling booths were the same as those used in the April election.

References

Citations

Bruce 1865-07
Bruce
Bryce
Bruce